Eastern Lombard is a group of closely related variants of Lombard, a Gallo-Italic language spoken in Lombardy, mainly in the provinces of Bergamo, Brescia and Mantua, in the area around Cremona and in parts of Trentino. Its main variants are Bergamasque and Brescian.

In Italian-speaking contexts, Eastern Lombard is often called a dialetto ("dialect"), understood to mean not a variety of Italian, but a local language that is part of the Romance languages dialect continuum that pre-dates the establishment of Tuscan-based Italian. 

Eastern Lombard and Italian have only limited mutual intelligibility, like many other Romance languages spoken in Italy.

Eastern Lombard does not have any official status either in Lombardy or anywhere else: the only official language in Lombardy is Italian.

Classification
Eastern Lombard is a Romance language of the Gallo-Italic branch, closer to Occitan, Catalan, French, etc. than to Italian, with a Celtic substratum.

Geographic distribution
Eastern Lombard is primarily spoken in Eastern Lombardy (Northern Italy), in the provinces of Bergamo and Brescia, in the Northern region of the province of Mantua and in the area around Crema.
The varieties spoken in these regions are generally mutually intelligible for speakers of neighboring areas, but this is not always true for distant peripheral areas. For instance, an inhabitant of the alpine valleys of Bergamo can hardly be understood by a rural inhabitant of the plains of Mantua. Differences include  lexical, grammatical and phonetic aspects.

Phonology
The following notes are essentially based on the variety of Eastern Lombard spoken in Brescia. The basic principle are generally valid also for the other varieties but local discrepancies can be found.

Eastern Lombard has 9 vowels and 20 consonants.

Consonants

This phenomenon, common to other languages (including German, Catalan, Dutch, Turkish and Russian), is called final devoicing. The phoneme  only occurs in loanwords, often borrowings from Italian. For example, scià, "to ski" (from Italian sciare) is pronounced . The phoneme  is pronounced  before a consonant. This never occurs inside a word as the segment  + consonant doesn't exist in Eastern Lombard. However, it does occur when  appears word-finally preceding another word which begins with a consonant. For example:

 I è nacc vià  = "they have gone away" i è nacc a spas  = "they have gone for a leisury walk"

 Töcc du  = "both", "each of the two" töcc öndes  = "all of the eleven"

This can be seen in the following examples:

  = "how much"   = "brooded"
  = "dish"   = "bitten"

Locally, the alveolar fricative  is replaced by the glottal fricative . However, even in areas where this phenomenon is the rule, there are some interesting exceptions to take in account. Words like grassie ("thanks") are never pronounced . At present, the most common pronunciation is  but a more genuine outcome (and often preferred by aged people) would be .

Other examples for this feature:

Licensià ("to dismiss, to fire") =  / 
Cristià ("Christian") =  / 
Pasiù ("passion") =  /

Assimilation
Regressive assimilation at word boundaries is common in Eastern Lombard. Assimilation can be either complete or partial. Complete assimilation occurs when two occlusive sounds fall in contact. In this case the first occlusive is completely absorbed by the second and the resulting sound has all the features of the second consonant but is notably lengthened. For example:

 el ga fat pàla = 
 l'è tròp calt ("it's too hot") = 
 el gat bianc ("the white cat") = 

The same phenomenon occurs when an occlusive consonant precedes a nasal or a liquid consonant. For example:

 en gat négher ("a black cat") = 
 l'è tròp mis = 
 so ché strac mórt ("I'm dead tired")= 

Complete assimilation can also occur when an occlusive precedes a fricative. For example: l'è nit vért = .

When a sequence of nasal+occlusive falls in contact with another occlusive or a fricative, the first occlusive is completely elided and the nasal undergoes partial assimilation. In this case no lengthening occurs. For example:

 el ga 'l sanch blö ("he's got blue blood")= 
 l'è lonc fés = 

But when an occlusive precedes , assimilation involves both consonants and the result is an affricate sound:

 l'è nit zó ècc = 
 l'è tròp zalt ("it's too yellow") = 

The phoneme  can undergo assimilation in place of articulation with a following consonant. For example:

 en ca ("a dog") = 
 vàghen fò ("hurry up") = 
 l'an pasàt ("last year") =

Vowels
Eastern Lombard has 9 vocalic sounds:

Other vowels can occur in final syllables in loanwords.

Locally, the phoneme  is pronounced  when it appears as last sound of the word in an unstressed syllable (actually slightly more close than cardinal ). For example:
 lüna ("moon") = 
 setemana ("week") =

Unstressed vowel system reduction and local variability
Some vowel contrasts are eliminated in unstressed syllables. For example, in the urban Brescian variety,  and  no longer contrast. In addition, a further variant  is also possible, though in this case, a difference is noticed by speakers but it is considered a local variant and no loss of intelligibility results.

In conclusion, it is possible to say that only five contrastive vowel qualities are found in unstressed syllables: //, /, /,  (but with the  not completely separated from /). Some examples:

 molà ("to let go, to release") 
 mölà ("to grind") 
 malàt ("sick, ill") 
 pelàt ("bald") 
 Milà ("Milan") 

The situation can differ for other Eastern Lombard varieties, however, and the rules of the unstressed vowel system vary according to the area.

 mulà instead of molà
 Ruàt ("Rovato") instead of Roàt
 Üspedalèt ("Ospitaletto") instead of Öspedalèt

Since in unstressed position these vocalic sounds are not contrastive, these local variants do not compromise reciprocal intelligibility.

Vowel harmony
Certain varieties of Eastern Lombard (mostly in Brescian area) exhibit a process of regressive vowel harmony involving the feature of vowel height. When the stress falls on a close vowel ( or ) the preceding vowels shift their height, becoming close as well ( and  become , while  and  become ). The vowel  is not affected by this process and acts as opaque vowel blocking the harmonization process.

This phenomenon affects all the words independent of the word's function.

Because the diminutive and augmentative are formed with the suffixes -ì and -ù (feminine -ìna and -ùna) respectively, this process is easily observable in nouns:

 cortèl ("knife")
 curtilì ("small knife")
 curtilù ("big knife")

As already mentioned, the vowel  acts as opaque vowel which blocks the harmonization process:

 fontàna ("fountain")
 fontanì ("small fountain"), not funtanì
 öspedàl ("hospital")
 öspedalì ("small hospital"), not üspidalì

 mortadèla ("mortadella")
 mortadilìna ("small mortadella")

In these cases variants like funtanì and üspedalì (but not üspidalì) or murtadilìna are accepted (or locally preferred) but fall under the normal unstressed vowel variability.

Verbs are affected by this process in their conjugation, when the inflection contains a stressed  (there are no verbal suffixes containing a stressed ). For example:

 öler ("to want")
 öle ("I want")
 ülìt ("wanted", past participle)
 ülìf ("you want", second person plural)
 ülìef ("you wanted", second person plural imperfect indicative)

Adjectives formed with the suffix -ùs (feminine -ùza) also exhibit this rule:

 póra ("fear")
 purús, purúza ("fearful person")

Orthography
Since Eastern Lombard is still principally an oral language, a commonly accepted orthography has not been established. While in recent years there has been an increasing production of texts (mainly light comedies and poem collections), each author continues to follow their own spelling rules.

This article follows the rules of the Italian orthography, with the following exceptions.

Vowels
Furthermore, the umlaut is adopted to represent the rounded vowels  and :

Note that grave and acute accents are also used to indicate the stressed syllable in non-monosyllabic words. Since unstressed vowels are less distinctive, it is not necessary to discriminate the open/close quality.

Consonants
The digraph  is used at the end of the word to represent the sound  (in other positions this sound is rendered by means of the usual Italian orthography rules:  before front vowels and  before non-front vowels).

A consonant sequence that is peculiar to Lombard is that of a voiceless alveolar fricative followed by a voiceless postalveolar affricate, . This sequence, which is absent in Italian, can occur at the beginning of word, as in s·cèt ("son, boy") ; in the middle, as in brös·cia ("brush") ; or at the end, as in giös·cc ("right, correct", plural) .

The sequence  is also present in Eastern Lombard and is represented in this article with the sequence of signs , for example:

 bàsgia ("large bowl") = 
 sgionfà ("to inflate") =

Grammar

The grammatical system of Eastern Lombard is similar to other those of other Romance languages. The word order is SVO (subject–verb–object) and it has a moderate inflection system: verbs are declined for mood, tense and aspect and agree with their subject in person and number. Nouns are classified as either masculine or feminine and can be marked as singular or plural. Adjectives and pronouns agree with any nouns they modify in gender and number. Eastern Lombard also prefers prepositions over case marking.

Literature
The oldest known text written in Eastern Lombard consists of fragments of a laud known as Mayor gremeza il mund no pothevela ancor aver, a manuscript found in Bovegno (Trompia valley), and dating from the fourteenth century. Today, literary production has increased in volume and mainly consists in light comedies and poem collections (Angelo Canossi is an example for poetry in the Brescian dialect).

Examples
The following tale is in Brescian:

La mèrla

I mèrli 'na ólta i ghìa le pène biànche, ma chèl envéren lé l'éra stàt en bèl envéren e lé, la mèrla, la gà dìt: "Zenér de la màla gràpa, per tò despèt gó i uzilì 'ndela gnàta." A lü, 'l Zenér, gh'è nìt adòs 'n pó de ràbia, e 'l gà dìt: "Spèta, mèrla, che te la faró mé adès a té, e se te sét biànca mé te faró ègner négra." E pò dòpo 'l gà dit amò: "Dù ghe i ó e giü 'n prèstet el töaró e se te sét biànca, mé te faró ní négra." E alùra 'l gà fàt nì fò 'n frèt che se n'ìa mài vést giü compàgn.

Lé la mèrla la saìa piö che fà cói sò uzilì ndèla gnàta, e isé l'è nàda a rifügiàs endèla càpa del camì; dré al camì va sö 'l föm e lùr i uzilì i è déentàcc töcc négher, e quànche i è nicc fò de là, la mèrla la gh'ìa mìa piö le pène biànche, ma la ghe i éra négre. Alùra Zenér, töt sudisfàt, el gà dìt: "Tò mèrla, che te l'ó fàda mé staólta: se te se stàda biànca mé t'ó fàt ní négra e isé te làset lé de seghetà a tiràm en gìr."

Phonetic transcription

The she-blackbird

Once upon a time blackbirds had white feathers, but in that time winter had been mild and a she-blackbird scorned January saying: "Bad-headed January, in spite of you I have got a brood in my nest." Hearing this, January got angry and he said: "Just wait a bit, you she-blackbird, I will fool you and I will turn you from white into black." Then he said: "I have got two, and I will borrow one, and I will turn you from white to black." And he brought forth a cold as there had never been before.

The she-blackbird did not know how to cope with her brood in the nest, so she sheltered in the hood of a chimney, and the smoke turned all the birds black; so when they came out the blackbirds did not have white feathers anymore, but black ones. And January, very happy, said: "This time it was me that fooled you, blackbird: you were white and I turned you black, this will teach you to stop teasing me."

See also
 Bergamasque
 Lombard languages
 Western Lombard
 Plural inflection in Eastern Lombard

Notes

References

External links
 Orbilat - An interesting site more for western lombard, but the map of the distribution of the two main varieties is noteworthy.
 Poetry in Eastern Lombard from 1902 (in Italian)
 Copy of the original dictionary Bresciano - Italiano (work in progress, in Italian)
 a Casiratese-Italian vocabulary, a dictionary for the Bergamasque (Casirate d'Adda) dialect, in Italian.
 A Dictionary for the Camunic variant of Eastern Lombard.
 A collection of comedies in Bergamasque

Eastern Lombard language
Languages of Lombardy
Languages of Trentino-Alto Adige/Südtirol
Languages of Brazil